HMS Dee was a Palmer Type River Class Destroyer ordered by the Royal Navy under the 1901–1902 Naval Estimates.  Named after the River Dee near Liverpool, England, she was the fourth ship to carry this name since it was introduced in 1814 for a 20-gun 6th rate sold in 1819.

Construction
She was laid down on 5 March 1902 at the Palmer’s shipyard at Jarrow and launched on 10 September 1903. She was completed in May 1904. Her original armament was to be the same as the Turleback torpedo boat destroyers that preceded her. In 1906 the Admiralty decided to upgrade the armament by landing the five 6-pounder naval guns and shipping three 12-pounder 8 hundredweight (cwt) guns.  Two would be mounted abeam at the foc'x'le break and the third gun would be mounted on the quarterdeck.

Pre-War
After commissioning she was assigned to China Station in late 1904.

In September 1905 HMS Dee under the command of Lieutenant Commander Harold E Sullivan, RN, while accompanying HMS Exe encountered a severe typhoon between Wei-hai-wei and Shanghai.  Both ships weathered the storm and proved the seaworthiness of the River Class design.

On 30 August 1912 the Admiralty directed all destroyer classes were to be designated by alpha characters starting with the letter 'A'.  The ships of the River Class were assigned to the E Class.  After 30 September 1913, she was known as an E Class destroyer and had the letter ‘E’ painted on the hull below the bridge area and on either the fore or aft funnel.

World War I
Upon her return to Home Waters 1914 she was in the 9th Destroyer Flotilla based at Chatham tendered to HMS St George.  The 9th Flotilla was a patrol flotilla tasked with anti-submarine and countermining patrols in the Firth of Forth area.  Soon after the commencement of hostilities she was deployed to the Scapa Flow Local Flotilla under the command of the Commander-in-Chief Home Fleet tendered to HMS St Vincent.  Her duties here included counter mining patrols and antisubmarine measures in defence of the Fleet anchorage.

In August 1915 with the amalgamation of the 9th and 7th Flotillas she was deployed to the 7th Destroyer Flotilla based at the River Humber.  She remained employed on the Humber Patrol participating in counter mining operations and anti-submarine patrols for the remainder of the war.

Disposal
In 1919 she was paid off and laid up in reserve awaiting disposal.  On 23 July 1919 she was sold to Thos. W. Ward of Sheffield for breaking at Briton Ferry, Glamorgan in Wales.

She was not awarded a Battle Honour for her service.

Pennant Numbers

References

Bibliography
 
 
 
 
 
 
 
 

 

River-class destroyers
1903 ships